In enzymology, an apigenin 4'-O-methyltransferase is an enzyme that catalyzes the chemical reaction

S-adenosyl-L-methionine + 5,7,4'-trihydroxyflavone  S-adenosyl-L-homocysteine + 4'-methoxy-5,7-dihydroxyflavone

Thus, the two substrates of this enzyme are S-adenosyl methionine and 5,7,4'-trihydroxyflavone (apigenin), whereas its two products are S-adenosylhomocysteine and 4'-methoxy-5,7-dihydroxyflavone (acacetin).

This enzyme belongs to the family of transferases, specifically those transferring one-carbon group methyltransferases.  The systematic name of this enzyme class is S-adenosyl-L-methionine:5,7,4'-trihydroxyflavone 4'-O-methyltransferase. Other names in common use include flavonoid O-methyltransferase, and flavonoid methyltransferase.  This enzyme participates in flavonoid biosynthesis.

References 

 

EC 2.1.1
Enzymes of unknown structure
O-methylated flavones metabolism